Huliya is a 1996 Indian Kannada-language action drama film written and directed by K. V. Raju and produced by G. Govind and Kadur Ramesh under the Shri Raghavendra Films banner. It stars Devaraj and Archana. Apart from them, the film stars Pooja Lokesh, Avinash, Srinivasa Murthy, Sanketh Kashi in important roles. Sadhu Kokila composed the film's score and soundtrack.

Cast 
The cast:

 Devaraj as Huliya, innocent villager
 Archana as Mydani, wife of Huliya
 Pooja Lokesh as Rekha, journalist
 Avinash as Madagi, crooked politician
 Srinivasa Murthy as Chief Minister
 Lohithaswa as Newspaper Editor
 Sharath Lohitashwa as Raama, child trafficker
 Sanket Kashi as Shegani, broker
 Bank Janardhan as District Commissioner
 Mandeep Roy as pimp in brothel
 Sindhu Menon (credited as Baby Sindhu) as Puttagowri, Huliya's daughter

Soundtrack 
Sadhu Kokila composed the soundtrack album for the film.

Awards 
1995–96: Karnataka State Film Awards - Best Supporting Actress - Pooja Lokesh

References

External links

1996 films
Indian action drama films
1990s Kannada-language films
1990s action drama films